Nordbeck is a surname. Notable people with the surname include:

Cato Nordbeck (fl. 1965), Norwegian cyclist
Peter Nordbeck (silversmith) (1789–1861), German silversmith
Peter Nordbeck (born 1938), Swedish Navy vice admiral